Li Guanxi (born 25 September 1998) is a Chinese footballer currently playing as a goalkeeper for Shandong Taishan.

Club career
Li Guanxi was promoted to the senior team of Shandong Luneng (now renamed Shandong Taishan) within the 2020 Chinese Super League season and would make his debut in a league game against Hebei China Fortune F.C. on 26 October 2020 in a 2-2 draw, where he came on as a substitute for Wang Dalei. He would go on to establish himself as a reserve choice goalkeeper within the team throughout the league season and would be included in the squad within the 2020 Chinese FA Cup final against Jiangsu Suning F.C. that ended in a 2-0 victory. This would be followed by his first league title with the club when he was part of the team that won the 2021 Chinese Super League title.

Career statistics

Honours

Club
Shandong Luneng/ Shandong Taishan
Chinese Super League: 2021.
Chinese FA Cup: 2020, 2021, 2022.

References

External links

1998 births
Living people
Chinese footballers
China youth international footballers
Association football goalkeepers
Chinese Super League players
Shandong Taishan F.C. players